The Halmahera mine is a large mine in the east of Indonesia in the North Maluku. Halmahera represents one of the largest nickel reserve in Indonesia having estimated reserves of 466 million tonnes of ore grading 1.5% nickel. The 466 million tonnes of ore contains 7 million tonnes of nickel metal.

References 

Nickel mines in Indonesia